James Honeyman-Scott (4 November 1956 – 16 June 1982) was an English rock guitarist, songwriter and founding member of the band The Pretenders.

With the band, Honeyman-Scott established a reputation, in the words of AllMusic, as "one of the most original and versatile guitarists of the early-'80s new wave movement." In addition to his role as lead guitarist, Honeyman-Scott co-wrote a number of songs for the band, sang back-up vocals and played keyboards on a few tracks. The song "Back on the Chain Gang" was written as a tribute to him by Chrissie Hynde.

Early years and musical influences
Honeyman-Scott, along with Pretenders bandmates Pete Farndon (bass guitar, vocals) and Martin Chambers (drums, vocals, percussion), came from Hereford. Before joining the Pretenders, Honeyman-Scott played in several bands, including a precursor to The Enid with Robert John Godfrey, the Hawks (Kelv Wilson, bass guitar & vocals; Dave Plowman, guitar; Stan Speke, drums), The Hot Band, and The Cheeks.

Fellow members in The Cheeks included Chambers and ex-Mott the Hoople keyboardist Verden Allen, Kelv Wilson (bass guitar, vocals). When Honeyman-Scott joined The Pretenders, he was growing vegetables and selling guitars in a music store in Widemarsh Street, Hereford, called Buzz Music.

Honeyman-Scott acknowledged a number of influences on his guitar-playing (Guitar Player, 1981). Early musical influences included Cream and the Allman Brothers Band. Later, he was influenced by the lead lines and finger vibrato used by Mick Ralphs of Mott the Hoople.

Honeyman-Scott also credited Nick Lowe and Elvis Costello with their "big jangly" Rickenbacker-influenced guitar sound. During his tenure with the Pretenders, Dave Edmunds and Billy Bremner from Rockpile were influential, as well as Nils Lofgren and Chris Spedding.

Pretenders

During the mid-1970s, Honeyman-Scott met future Pretenders bandmate Pete Farndon while the bassist was playing with Cold River Lady in Hereford (Melody Maker, 1979). In 1978, Farndon recruited Honeyman-Scott for a series of Pretenders rehearsals and recording sessions, and he officially joined the group that summer (New Musical Express, 1980). Chrissie Hynde recalled, "As soon as I heard Jimmy Scott, I knew I was getting close. Jimmy and I turned out to have a genuine musical affinity".

Honeyman-Scott's role in shaping the Pretenders' sound primarily involved adding melodic lead lines to existing songs to help tie them together. He recalled in the early days, "We did lots of rehearsing – seven days a week, all hours of the day and night. At first a lot of the licks were very heavy – like 'Up the Neck' started off as a reggae song. I said, 'Let's speed it up,' and put in that little guitar run. The melodic parts of the numbers really all started coming together by me putting in these little runs and licks.  And then Chrissie started to like pop music, and that's why she started writing things like 'Kid'".

Hynde and Honeyman-Scott have both acknowledged the influence their contrasting styles had on each other (Guitar Player, 1981; Uncut, 1999). According to Honeyman-Scott, Hynde had a unique style he adjusted to in several ways: "She does quite a bit of rhythm guitar, and I don't know anybody who plays like her. It's real distinct, and I can't count her beat half the time. Instead, I just put a little guitar line over it, like the lick in 'Tattooed Love Boys'" (Guitar Player, 1981). He joked about his other strategy: "I've never told them I can't work out their time at all! They are used to me coming in a bar too late; they think that's the way I play. But it's because I've missed where she comes in! I just bluff it and hope for the best."

In May and June 1982, Honeyman-Scott was first in Los Angeles and then in Austin, Texas, for a short visit with his wife Peggy Sue Fender (an actress/model based in Austin, Texas and also a member of the British girl group Girls Can't Help It), whom he had married in April 1981. His wife was staying with local guitarist Mark Younger Smith at this time (FamousInterview.com). While in Austin, he became involved in his first co-production effort for an album by Stephen Doster that was never released. During the sessions with Stephen Doster in Austin, Honeyman-Scott was called back to London for a band meeting on 14 June with Chrissie Hynde and Martin Chambers that resulted in the dismissal of Pete Farndon from the Pretenders, due to Farndon's increasing substance dependence.

Death

Two days after the dismissal of Pete Farndon, Honeyman-Scott was found dead in a girlfriend's apartment of heart failure caused by cocaine intolerance.

He was 25 years old at the time of his death. He was buried in the churchyard at St Peter's Church, Lyde, Herefordshire.

Legacy
Although Honeyman-Scott died young, he influenced other well-known guitarists such as Johnny Marr, who noted that "most of all, the jingle-jangle came from James Honeyman-Scott of the Pretenders. He was the last important influence on my playing before I went out on my own. The first time I played 'Kid' with the Pretenders, I couldn't believe it. I've used that solo to warm up with every day for years."

Honeyman-Scott is also credited with discovering Violent Femmes, who opened for the Pretenders at the Oriental Theatre in Milwaukee, Wisconsin, while the band was on tour.

Honeyman-Scott's death profoundly affected the Pretenders' subsequent direction and longevity. Hynde later said, "One of the things that kept the band alive, ironically, was the death of Jimmy Scott. I felt I couldn't let the music die when he died. We'd worked too hard to get it where it was....  I had to finish what we'd started". At the group meeting on 14 June 1982, Honeyman-Scott suggested bringing Robbie McIntosh into the group in some capacity. After Honeyman-Scott's death, McIntosh became the group's lead guitarist for several years.

In 2005, Honeyman-Scott was posthumously inducted into the Rock and Roll Hall of Fame alongside Hynde, Farndon and Chambers as a member of the Pretenders.

Discography
1974 – Fall of Hyperion – Robert John Godfrey (as Jim Scott)
1979 – Place Your Bets – Tommy Morrison
1980 – Pretenders – Pretenders
1981 – Pretenders II – Pretenders

Equipment

Honeyman-Scott used a number of guitars during his professional career, including the following:
Gibson ES-335 used for Pretenders debut and songs on the Robert John Godfrey album
Gibson Les Paul Jr. (1957 – borrowed from Mick Ralphs of Mott the Hoople)
Gibson Les Paul (used to record the debut album)
Ice Blue Gibson Firebird (used in early shows 1978)
Gibson Firebird (1963)
Gibson Firebird (Pink)
Travis Bean Wedge (white, as seen in the video for "Stop Your Sobbing")
Hamer Custom-built guitars(3, one red known as "Red One", one white with Honeyman in mother of pearl up the neck known as "Honeyman", and one Explorer prototype [currently known as the Hamer Standard])
Music Man Stingray
Rickenbacker 360/12 used during Extended Play / Pretenders II sessions
Zemaitis (1980) Metal Front Guitar (2)
Zemaitis (1980) Pearl Front Guitar
Zemaitis (1981) Dragon (Wedding Axe)
Zemaitis (1981) Scorpion Disc Front Guitar
Vintage National Steel Guitar (gift from Jackson Browne, 1982)

Just before joining the Pretenders, Honeyman-Scott used an Ibanez Gibson-Explorer style with an Electro-Harmonix Clone Theory pedal and Marshall amplifier in an attempt to emulate the Rickenbacker 12-string sound on songs by Elvis Costello and Nick Lowe (Guitar Player, 1981). Honeyman-Scott recorded most of his guitar parts for the Pretenders debut album using a Gibson ES-335 or Gibson Les Paul.

Honeyman-Scott owned several acoustic guitars including a Gibson Dove, Martin D-28, and a Guild 12-string. Jimmy used Marshall 100-watt amplifiers and BOSS chorus, overdrive, and compressor effects pedals.

References

Sources
 Austin Chronicle, Sept 26, 1982, Stephen Doster—Working Class Hero, by Andy Langer, accessed 23 July 2006 at 
 Guitar Player, April 1981, The Pretenders James Honeyman-Scott, by Jas Obrecht accessed 3 July 2006, at 
 Guitar Player, January 1990, Guitar Hero Johnny Marr: The Smiths and Beyond, by Joe Gore, accessed 3 July 2006, at 
 Dantzig Design Group, 2006, "James Honeyman-Scott of the Pretenders."  Hamer Unofficial Artist Archives. Accessed 30 July 2006, at 
 IO Productions, Inc., undated, Interview with Victor de Lorenzo, by "Gaignaire" as part of MusiCalifornia radio program. Transcript accessed 8 July 2006 at 
 Melody Maker, 17 February 1979, Say a Prayer for the Pretenders, by Mark Williams.
 New Musical Express, 26 January 1980, Only a Hobo Only a Star, by Paul Morley.
 Rhino Entertainment Company, 2006, This is Pirate Radio, by Ben Edmonds. Pirate Radio Box Set booklet.
 Uncut, June 1999, Rock and Roll Heart (Pretenders Special), by Allan Jones, pp. 46–65.
 Washington DC City Paper, 3 February 1984, Hynde Sight, by Michazil Yockel, accessed 4 July 2006, at  
 Angel Air Records: Verden Allen Interview: Page 7 1999, accessed 6 December 2011 at

External links
 James Honeyman-Scott: The Complete 1981 Interview, Jas Obrecht
 Pretenders 977 Radio

1956 births
1982 deaths
People from Hereford
English new wave musicians
English rock guitarists
English songwriters
The Pretenders members
Drug-related deaths in England
20th-century English musicians
Lead guitarists
20th-century British guitarists